A Believer Sings the Truth is a gospel double album and 63rd overall album by American country singer Johnny Cash.
The tracks for the double-length album were all recorded in 1979.

Cash was under contract to Columbia Records, but the label was doubtful that a double-album of gospel songs was commercially viable. With the label's blessing, Cash was allowed to release it on his own on the Cachet label and as a radio special with added narration.

His efforts paid off, as the album made it into the Country Top 50, peaking at #43.

In 1982, Columbia reissued the album itself, and in 1984 an edited-down version titled I Believe appeared on Arrival Records (see below).

Prior to 2012 the only CD release of tracks from the album occurred with two tracks appearing in the God portion of the 2004 box set Love, God, Murder (a set compiled by Cash soon before his death in 2003), and two more tracks appeared on 2007's Ultimate Gospel. The complete contents of the album (plus a previously unreleased outtake) made their CD debut as Disk 1 of the 2012 release Bootleg Vol. IV: The Soul of Truth. It is one of only a handful of Columbia-related albums not to be included in the 2012 box set release Johnny Cash: The Complete Columbia Album Collection.

Track listing

Charts
Album - Billboard (United States)

I Believe

In 1984, I Believe was released on the Arrival Records label, featuring ten songs from A Believer Sings the Truth and four outtakes from the same sessions.  Like its parent album, I Believe has not been released on CD.

Track listing

References 

Johnny Cash albums
1979 albums
Albums produced by Jack Clement
Columbia Records albums
Gospel albums by American artists